Moroz is a surname meaning "frost" in Ukrainian and Russian. The surname is particularly common in Ukraine and, to a lesser extent, in Russia. It is a cognate of Maroz (Belarusian), Mróz (Polish), and Mráz (Czech and Slovak). Morozs is the Latvian adaptation of the surname.

People
Alexander Moroz (1961–2009), Ukrainian chess grandmaster
Anatoliy Moroz (born 1948), Ukrainian track and field athlete
Andy Moroz, American trombonist
Artem Moroz (born 1984), Ukrainian rower
Darya Moroz (born 1983), Russian actress
Hennadiy Moroz (born 1975), Ukrainian football player
Irene Moroz, British applied mathematician
Leonid Moroz, Russian-American neuroscientist
Maryna Moroz (born 1991), Ukrainian mixed martial artist
Nataliya Moroz (born 1976), Belarusian biathlete
Oleksandr Moroz (born 1944), Ukrainian politician
Olga Moroz (born 1966), Belarusian archer
Olha Moroz (born 1970), Ukrainian sprinter
Pavel Moroz (born 1987), Ukrainian-Russian volleyball player
Pavlo Moroz (born 1974), Ukrainian lawyer
Regina Moroz (born 1987), Russian volleyball player
Vasyl Moroz (born 1942), Ukrainian academic
Viktor Moroz (born 1968), Ukrainian football player
Viktors Morozs (born 1980), Latvian football player
Yuri Moroz (director) (born 1956), Ukrainian-Russian film director
Yuriy Moroz (born 1970), Ukrainian football player

See also
 
 
Morozov (surname), a surname more common in Russia
Boris Morros, Hollywood film maker, composer, double agent (KGB and FBI)

Ukrainian-language surnames
Surnames of Ukrainian origin